Valsarna is a speedway club from Tallhult, Hagfors in Sweden, who compete in the Allsvenskan. Their home track is at the Tallhult Motorstadion which is located to the North of Hagfors on the road to Geijersholm.

History

Valsarna Speedway Club was founded on 11 October 1967. The team won the Swedish Speedway Team Championship in the consecutive years of 1998 and 1999, when they competed in the highest league called the Elitserien.

On several occasions the club have competed in the second tier of Swedish speedway, the Allsvenskan (National League), which they won in 1993 and 2009. From 2003 until 2009 the team competed in the second tier before returning to the Elitserien following their league win. The club have since returned to the Allsvenskan, a competition that they won again during the 2022 Swedish Speedway season.

Season summary

Teams

2023 team

2022 team

References 

Swedish speedway teams
Sport in Värmland County